Daniel, Dan or Danny Gray may refer to:

Dan Gray (American football) (born 1956), American football defensive tackle
Dan Gray (footballer) (born 1989), English footballer
Danny Gray (rugby union) (born 1983), English rugby union player
Danny Gray (American football) (born 1999), American football wide receiver